Helen Mary Haines (born 21 September 1961) is an Australian politician who has served as the independent MP for the Victorian seat of Indi since the 2019 federal election.

Early life and education
Haines grew up on a dairy farm in Colac in southwestern Victoria with four brothers, and attended a public school in Eurack. She trained as a registered nurse at St Vincent's Hospital and later as a midwife at Mercy Hospital for Women in Melbourne. In 1986, she moved to northeastern Victoria and began working as a midwife at Wangaratta Base Hospital before being appointed matron and Director of Nursing at the Chiltern Bush Nursing Hospital. Haines completed a bachelor's degree at Deakin University and a master's degree in epidemiology and public health at the University of New South Wales. In 2004, she travelled to Stockholm to study at Uppsala University, completing a doctoral degree in medical science in 2012. She also completed a postdoctoral fellowship at the Karolinska Institute, with her doctoral thesis titled "‘No worries’: A longitudinal study of fear, attitudes and beliefs about childbirth from a cohort of Australian and Swedish women".

Haines is one of eleven MPs in the 46th Parliament of Australia who possesses a PhD, the others being Katie Allen, Fiona Martin, Anne Aly, Andrew Leigh, Daniel Mulino, Jess Walsh, Adam Bandt, Mehreen Faruqi, Anne Webster and Jim Chalmers.

Politics

On 13 January 2019, Haines was endorsed by community organisation Voices 4 Indi as the potential successor to incumbent MP Cathy McGowan for the division of Indi in the 2019 federal election. McGowan, an independent, had won the seat from the Liberal Party in the 2013 election and retained it in 2016, and had stated that she would retire at the 2019 election if she was confident that an independent successor, chosen by Voices 4 Indi, would be able to retain the seat. On 14 January 2019, McGowan formally announced her pending retirement, stating her confidence in Haines and endorsing her for the election.

In the lead up to the election, Haines advocated for an increase to the Jobseeker Payment and strong action on climate change, including a target of 50% renewable energy by 2030. She was one of seven independent candidates in the election to sign a joint agreement to cooperate on climate action in the new parliament; she also voiced her opposition to the proposed Adani coal mine in Queensland. She stressed the need for a national rural health service strategy and greater investment in rural infrastructure. She did not express a preference for either the Coalition or the Labor Party, stating that she would be willing to work with the government in either majority or minority. She also promised to hold the government accountable for promises it had made for Indi during the campaign.

In the 2019 federal election, Haines won Indi, winning 32.4% of the primary vote and 51.4% of the two-party preferred vote. She defeated Liberal Steve Martin on the sixth count on Labor preferences. She became the first independent in Australian history to succeed another independent in a federal seat.

In November 2021, Haines introduced a bill in the House of Representatives to create a Federal Independent Commission Against Corruption. The bill had majority support from independents, the Greens, the opposition Labor Party, and even Bridget Archer (the Liberal Party MP for Bass, who crossed the floor to vote in favour of debate). Despite this, the governing Liberal/National Coalition voted down debate on the bill, they were able to win the vote due to not all MPs being present in the chamber.

At the 2022 federal election, Haines was re-elected with a significantly increased margin.

Personal life

Haines and her husband live on a beef farm outside Wangaratta. They have three children.

References

External links
 Official site

Living people
Independent members of the Parliament of Australia
Members of the Australian House of Representatives for Indi
Members of the Australian House of Representatives
Women members of the Australian House of Representatives
Deakin University alumni
University of New South Wales alumni
Uppsala University alumni
Academic staff of the University of Melbourne
University of Melbourne women
21st-century Australian politicians
21st-century Australian women politicians
1961 births